John Siddique (born July 1964) is best known as a spiritual teacher, poet, and author.
He is the founder of Authentic Living, through which he aims to encourage people from all walks of life awaken to what he calls their "true naturalness".

Siddique is not aligned with any particular religion, philosophy, or tradition. Known for his authenticity, humour, and "feet on the ground" wisdom, his work has quietly reached millions of people. He has to date published eight books. His teachings and writings have featured in Time Magazine, The Guardian, Granta, on CNN and the BBC. The Times of India calls him "Rebellious by nature, pure at heart." The Spectator magazine describes him as "A stellar British poet." New York Times correspondent Bina Shah says Siddique is "One of the best poets of our generation." Former Scottish Poet Laureate Jackie Kay speaks of Siddique's writing as being "A brilliant balancing act."

Siddique is the Honorary Fellow in Creative Writing at Leicester University. He is the former Laureate of the British city of Canterbury, and British Council Poet in Residence at California State University, Los Angeles. Over the years, he has held a number of roles with the Royal Literary Fund (RLF), including being the RLF Fellow at York St. John University. Alongside his spiritual work, he is a commissioning editor for the Royal Literary Fund's WritersMosaic initiative.

Born in the United Kingdom, Siddique initially had a difficult early life and rebelled against school and society. He later attended Manchester University as a mature student, gaining a master's degree in Literature. His studies of meditation, yoga and inner healing began at the age of thirteen, at first from books, then in the deep practical study of the great religions and practices, before setting all labels aside after a series of profound shifts in consciousness, which included a near-death experience in 2014.

Personal life
The young Siddique immersed himself in the world of books through his local library. Before becoming a writer, he drifted through various jobs such as being a roadie, a pipe-welder, and landscape gardener. He first began writing in 1991 after reading James Joyce's Ulysses and discovering the poetry of e.e. cummings, Walt Whitman, and D. H. Lawrence. Siddique has stated in interviews that he regards his true countries of birth to be "literature and language".

Published works
Non-Fiction
 Signposts of The Spiritual Journey (Watkins Publishing, 2021) 

Poetry
 So – Selected New Poems 2011–21 (Crocus, 2022)
 Full Blood (Salt Publishing, 2011)
 Recital – An Almanac (Salt, 2009)
 Blackpool – A Poet’s View (Blackpool Council, 2009)
 Poems from a Northern Soul (Crocus, 2007)
 Transparency (editor) (Crocus, 2006)
 The Prize (Rialto, 2005)
 The Devil's Lunchbox (Crocus, 1996)

Short stories
 Four Fathers (co-author) (Route, 2007)

For children
 Don’t Wear It On Your Head (Salt, 2010)

Selected anthologies
 New Writing 15 (Granta)
 The Fire People (Payback/Canongate Books)
 The HarperCollins Book of English Poetry (HarperCollins)
 Masala (MacMillan)
 Out of Bounds (Bloodaxe Books)
 RED (Peepal Tree Press)
 Life Lines – Poets for Oxfam CD
 I Am The Seed That Grew The Tree (Nosy Crow/National Trust)

Prizes, awards and honours
Hawthornden Fellowship
Royal Literary Fund Fellow – York St. John University, 2013–15
Honorary Creative Writing Fellow at Leicester University
Arts Council of England Writer's Awards, 2005, 2006, 2007, 2011
Shortlisted for CPLE Poetry Award, 2007
Nomination for Best First Collection – Forward Prize, 2005
Nomination for Best Poem – Forward Prize, 2004

Residencies
Canterbury Poet Laureate 2016
Royal Literary Fund Fellow – York St. John 2013/15 & 2014/15
Manchester Literature Festival, 2010
Los Angeles for The British Council, 2009
Blackpool – Poet in Residence, 2008
Manchester Art Gallery, 2008
Fundacion Valparaiso, 2006 
The Rainer Charity, Wigan, 2005 
Commonword/BBC Manchester – Poet in Residence, 2005
Ilkley Literature Festival - Poet in Residence, 2004
HMYOI Wetherby – Writer in Residence, 2000–03
Ledbury Poetry Festival – Writer in Residence for Young People, 2000–03
The LOWRY – Poet in residence, 2000–01
Prestwich NHS Trust – Poet in Residence, 2000

References

External links
 Authentic Living Website
 Granta
 British Council Information Page
 Interview at The Argotist 
 California State University Poet in Residence Page

1964 births
Living people
Place of birth missing (living people)
21st-century British poets
21st-century British male writers
British male poets
British male writers
Spiritual teachers